Phosgene is the organic chemical compound with the formula COCl2. It is a toxic, colorless gas; in low concentrations, its musty odor resembles that of freshly cut hay or grass. It can be thought of as formaldehyde with the hydrogen atoms replaced by chlorine atoms. Phosgene is a valued and important industrial building block, especially for the production of precursors of polyurethanes and polycarbonate plastics.

Phosgene is extremely poisonous and was used as a chemical weapon during World War I, where it was responsible for 85,000 deaths. It is a highly potent pulmonary irritant and quickly filled enemy trenches due to it being a heavy gas.

It is classified as a Schedule 3 substance under the Chemical Weapons Convention. In addition to its industrial production, small amounts occur from the breakdown and the combustion of organochlorine compounds, such as chloroform.

Structure and basic properties
Phosgene is a planar molecule as predicted by VSEPR theory. The C=O distance is 1.18 Å, the C−Cl distance is 1.74 Å and the Cl−C−Cl angle is 111.8°. Phosgene is a carbon oxohalide and it can be considered one of the simplest acyl chlorides, being formally derived from carbonic acid.

Production 
Industrially, phosgene is produced by passing purified carbon monoxide and chlorine gas through a bed of porous activated carbon, which serves as a catalyst:
CO + Cl2 → COCl2 (ΔHrxn = −107.6 kJ/mol)

This reaction is exothermic and is typically performed between 50 and 150 °C. Above 200 °C, phosgene reverts to carbon monoxide and chlorine, Keq(300 K) = 0.05. World production of this compound was estimated to be 2.74 million tonnes in 1989.

Phosgene is fairly simple to produce, but is listed as a Schedule 3 substance under the Chemical Weapons Convention. As such, it is usually considered too dangerous to transport in bulk quantities. Instead, phosgene is usually produced and consumed within the same plant, as part of an "on demand" process. This involves maintaining equivalent rates of production and consumption, which keeps the amount of phosgene in the system at any one time fairly low, reducing the risks in the event of an accident. Some batch production does still take place, but efforts are made to reduce the amount of phosgene stored.

Inadvertent generation 
Atmospheric chemistry
Upon ultraviolet (UV) irradiation in the presence of oxygen, simple organochlorides slowly convert into phosgene. Before the discovery of the Ozone hole in the late 1970s large quantities of these compounds were routinely used by industry. Phosgene levels in the troposphere were around 20-30 pptv at the time (peak 60 pptv), however these levels had not decreased significantly nearly 30 years later, despite organochloride production becoming restricted under the Montreal Protocol. 

Phosgene in the troposphere can last up to about 70 days and is removed primarily by hydrolysis with ambient humidity or cloudwater. Less than 1% makes it to the stratosphere, however is expected to have a lifetime of several years here since this layer is much drier and phosgene decomposes slowly through UV photolysis. Consequently, it does play a minor part in ozone depletion.

Combustion
Carbon tetrachloride (CCl4) can turn into phosgene when exposed to heat in air. This was a problem as carbon tetrachloride is an effective fire suppressant and was formerly in widespread use in fire extinguishers. There are reports of fatalities caused by its use to fight fires in confined spaces. Carbon tetrachloride's generation of phosgene and its own toxicity mean it is no longer used for this purpose.

Biologically
Phosgene is also formed as a metabolite of chloroform, likely via the action of cytochrome P-450.

History
Phosgene was synthesized by the Cornish chemist John Davy (1790–1868) in 1812 by exposing a mixture of carbon monoxide and chlorine to sunlight. He named it "phosgene" from Greek φῶς (phos, light) and γεννάω (gennaō, to give birth) in reference of the use of light to promote the reaction. It gradually became important in the chemical industry as the 19th century progressed, particularly in dye manufacturing.

Reactions and uses
The reaction of an organic substrate with phosgene is called phosgenation.

Synthesis of carbonates 
Diols react with phosgene to give either linear or cyclic carbonates (R = H, alkyl, aryl):
HOCR2−X−CR2OH + COCl2 →  [OCR2−X−CR2OC(O)−]n + 2 HCl
An example is the reaction of phosgene with bisphenol A to form polycarbonates.

Synthesis of isocyanates
The synthesis of isocyanates from amines illustrates the electrophilic character of this reagent and its use in introducing the equivalent synthon "CO2+":
RNH2 + COCl2 → RN=C=O + 2 HCl  (R = alkyl, aryl)
Such reactions are conducted on laboratory scale in the presence of a base such as pyridine that neutralizes the hydrogen chloride side-product. 

On an industrial scale, phosgene is used in excess to increase yield and avoid side reactions. The phosgene excess is separated during the work-up of resulting end products and recycled into the process, with any remaining phosgene decomposed in water using activated carbon as the catalyst.

Industrial uses
Phosgene is used in industry for the production of aromatic di-isocyanates like toluene diisocyanate (TDI) and methylene diphenyl diisocyanate (MDI), which are precursors for production of polyurethanes. It is also used to form polycarbonates, via a reaction with bisphenol A. More than 90% of the worldwide produced phosgene is used in these processes, with the biggest production units located in the United States (Texas and Louisiana), Germany, Shanghai, Japan, and South Korea. The most important producers are Dow Chemical, Covestro, and BASF. Phosgene is used in the production of aliphatic diisocyanates such as hexamethylene diisocyanate (HDI) and isophorone diisocyanate (IPDI), which are precursors for the production of advanced coatings. Phosgene is also used to produce monoisocyanates, used as pesticide precursors (e.g. methyl isocyanate (MIC).

Laboratory uses
In the research laboratory, due to safety concerns phosgene nowadays finds limited use in organic synthesis. A variety of substitutes have been developed, notably trichloromethyl chloroformate ("diphosgene"), a liquid at room temperature, and bis(trichloromethyl) carbonate ("triphosgene"), a crystalline substance. 

Aside from the widely used reactions described above, phosgene is also used to produce acyl chlorides from carboxylic acids:
RCO2H + COCl2 → RC(O)Cl + HCl + CO2

For this application, thionyl chloride is commonly used instead of phosgene in academic settings. 

Phosgene is used to produce chloroformates such as benzyl chloroformate:
ROH + COCl2 → ROC(O)Cl + HCl
In these syntheses, phosgene is used in excess to prevent formation of the corresponding carbonate ester.

With amino acids, phosgene (or its trimer) reacts to give amino acid N-carboxyanhydrides. More generally, phosgene acts to link two nucleophiles by a carbonyl group. For this purpose, alternatives to phosgene such as carbonyldiimidazole (CDI) are safer. CDI itself is prepared by reacting phosgene with imidazole. 

Phosgene is stored in metal cylinders. In the US, the cylinder valve outlet is a tapered thread known as "CGA 160" that is used only for phosgene.

Other reactions
Phosgene reacts with water to release hydrogen chloride and carbon dioxide:
COCl2 + H2O → CO2 + 2 HCl

Analogously, upon contact with ammonia, it converts to urea:
COCl2 + 4 NH3 → CO(NH2)2 + 2 NH4Cl

Halide exchange with nitrogen trifluoride and aluminium tribromide gives COF2 and COBr2, respectively.

Chemical warfare

It is listed on Schedule 3 of the Chemical Weapons Convention: All production sites manufacturing more than 30 tonnes per year must be declared to the OPCW. Although less toxic than many other chemical weapons such as sarin, phosgene is still regarded as a viable chemical warfare agent because of its simpler manufacturing requirements when compared to that of more technically advanced chemical weapons such as tabun, a  first-generation nerve agent.

Phosgene was first deployed as a chemical weapon by the French in 1915 in World War I. It was also used in a mixture with an equal volume of chlorine, with the chlorine helping to spread the denser phosgene. Phosgene was more potent than chlorine, though some symptoms took 24 hours or more to manifest.

Following the extensive use of phosgene during World War I, it was stockpiled by various countries.

Phosgene was then only infrequently used by the Imperial Japanese Army against the Chinese during the Second Sino-Japanese War. Gas weapons, such as phosgene, were produced by Unit 731.

Toxicology and safety
Phosgene is an insidious poison as the odor may not be noticed and symptoms may be slow to appear.

The odor detection threshold for phosgene is 0.4 ppm, four times the threshold limit value. Its high toxicity arises from the action of the phosgene on the –OH, –NH2 and –SH groups of the proteins in pulmonary alveoli (the site of gas exchange), respectively forming ester, amide and thioester functional groups in accord with the reactions discussed above. This results in disruption of the blood–air barrier, eventually causing pulmonary edema. The extent of damage in the alveoli does not primarily depend on phosgene concentration in the inhaled air, with the dose (amount of inhaled phosgene) being the critical factor. Dose can be approximately calculated as "concentration" × "duration of exposure". Therefore, persons in workplaces where there exists risk of accidental phosgene release usually wear indicator badges close to the nose and mouth. Such badges indicate the approximate inhaled dose, which allows for immediate treatment if the monitored dose rises above safe limits. 

In case of low or moderate quantities of inhaled phosgene, the exposed person is to be monitored and subjected to precautionary therapy, then released after several hours. For higher doses of inhaled phosgene (above 150 ppm × min) a pulmonary edema often develops which can be detected by X-ray imaging and regressive blood oxygen concentration. Inhalation of such high doses can eventually result in fatality within hours up to 2–3 days of the exposure.

The risk connected to a phosgene inhalation is based not so much on its toxicity (which is much lower in comparison to modern chemical weapons like sarin or tabun) but rather on its typical effects: the affected person may not develop any symptoms for hours until an edema appears, at which point it could be too late for medical treatment to assist. Nearly all fatalities as a result of accidental releases from the industrial handling of phosgene occurred in this fashion. On the other hand, pulmonary edemas treated in a timely manner usually heal in the mid- and longterm, without major consequences once some days or weeks after exposure have passed. Nonetheless, the detrimental health effects on pulmonary function from untreated, chronic low-level exposure to phosgene should not be ignored; although not exposed to concentrations high enough to immediately cause an edema, many synthetic chemists (e.g. Leonidas Zervas) working with the compound were reported to experience chronic respiratory health issues and eventual respiratory failure from continuous low-level exposure.
 
If accidental release of phosgene occurs in an industrial or laboratory setting, it can be mitigated with ammonia gas; in the case of liquid spills (e.g. of diphosgene or phosgene solutions) an absorbent and sodium carbonate can be applied.

Accidents
The first major phosgene-related incident happened in May 1928 when eleven tons of phosgene escaped from a war surplus store in central Hamburg. Three hundred people were poisoned, of whom ten died.
In the second half of 20th century several fatal incidents implicating phosgene occurred in Europe, Asia and the US. Most of them have been investigated by authorities and the outcome made accessible to the public. For example, phosgene was initially blamed for the Bhopal disaster, but investigations proved methyl isocyanate to be responsible for the numerous poisonings and fatalities.
 Recent major incidents happened in January 2010 and May 2016. An accidental release of phosgene gas at a DuPont facility in West Virginia killed one employee in 2010. The US Chemical Safety Board released a video detailing the accident. Six years later, a phosgene leak occurred in a BASF plant in South Korea, where a contractor inhaled a lethal dose of phosgene.
2023 Ohio train derailment: A freight train carrying vinyl chloride derailed and burned in East Palestine, Ohio, releasing phosgene and hydrogen chloride into the air and contaminating the Ohio River.

See also

Bhopal disaster
Carbonyl bromide
Carbonyl fluoride
Diphosgene
Formaldehyde
Oxalyl chloride
Thiophosgene
Triphosgene
Perfluoroisobutene
Bis(trifluoromethyl) disulfide

References

External links
Davy's account of his discovery of phosgene
International Chemical Safety Card 0007
CDC - Phosgene - NIOSH Workplace Safety and Health Topic
NIOSH Pocket Guide to Chemical Hazards
U.S. CDC Emergency Preparedness & Response
U.S. EPA Acute Exposure Guideline Levels
Regime For Schedule 3 Chemicals And Facilities Related To Such Chemicals, OPCW website
CBWInfo website
Use of Phosgene in WWII and in modern-day warfare
US Chemical Safety Board Video on accidental release at DuPont facility in West Virginia

Acyl chlorides
Inorganic carbon compounds
Nonmetal halides
Oxychlorides
Carbon oxohalides
Pulmonary agents
Reagents for organic chemistry
World War I chemical weapons